"Call Off the Search" is the second single of Georgian-born singer Katie Melua. It is the title song of her debut album, Call Off the Search. The single had two versions that both came out on the same day. The B-side of the second version, "Turn to Tell", was composed by Melua's guitar teacher, Justin Sandercoe. The song peaked at number 19 on the UK Singles Chart and number 27 in Ireland.

Track listings
Version one
 "Call Off the Search" (Mike Batt)
 "Shirt of a Ghost" (Katie Melua)
 "Deep Purple" (Mitchell Parish / Peter De Rose)

Version two
 "Call Off the Search" (Mike Batt)
 "Turn to Tell" (Justin Sandercoe)

Personnel
 Katie Melua – guitar, vocals
 Mike Batt – organ, piano, conductor, production, arrangement
 Jim Cregan – guitar
 Tim Harries – bass
 Irish Film Orchestra – orchestra
 Michael Kruk – drums
 Alan Smale – leader
 Chris Spedding – guitar you
 Henry Spinetti – drums
 Justin Sandercoe – production
 Steve Sale – engineering

Charts

References

Katie Melua songs
2003 songs
2004 singles
Dramatico singles
Song recordings produced by Mike Batt
Songs written by Mike Batt